Samuel Ejikeme Okoye (26 July 1939 – 18 November 2009) was a Nigerian astrophysicist from Amawbia in Anambra State, Nigeria. Okoye was the first black African to obtain a doctorate degree in Radio Astronomy.

Early life and education
Samuel Okoye was born in Amawbia, in south eastern Nigeria, to Simeon and Agnes Okoye. He was the fifth of nine children. Simeon died late in 1949 when Sam was ten years. He was raised by his mother and his eldest brother.

Okoye obtained a Bachelor of Science degree (B.Sc), First Class Honours in Physics from the University of London and a doctorate degree (PhD) in Radio Astronomy from Churchill College, University of Cambridge in the United Kingdom, making him the first black African to obtain a doctorate in Radio Astronomy.
Okoye arrived at Churchill College Cambridge in 1962, an exciting time in astrophysics. The research group he joined had by then expanded to become the Mullard Radio Astronomy Observatory. Okoye was supervised by Antony Hewish and investigated the structure of the interplanetary medium using scintillation. This was an observational project and research students at the time were expected to be quite literally hands-on, helping to build the instruments that they used. Okoye played his part in constructing two corner reflector antennas and their beam-switching circuits for a 38 MHz instrument, and building 13 preamplifiers for the 13 km cable link (described in Hewish & Okoye 1964). This instrument allowed Okoye to investigate the radio source in the Crab Nebula , catalogued as 3C144, finding unusual intensity variations in part of the signal. Scintillation analysis showed that the source of this component had an angular diameter of about 0.1 arcsec. Assuming it was coincident with the visible Crab supernova remnant, the source was about 1 milliparsec (200 au), with a brightness temperature of 1014K. These results raised a lot of questions about the nature of this unusual source: it was far too small to be explained by conventional synchrotron radiation. Hewish and Okoye (1964) suggested that they may have found signs of “an active remnant of the supernova explosion”.
We now know that the radio signal from the Crab nebula comes from a fast-spinning neutron star around 20 km across: a pulsar (figure 2). But this was the first indication that radio signals could come from such small sources. In 1967, after using her own set of pliers to help build a larger telescope covering 4.5 acres (one 50th of a square kilometer), Hewish's research student Jocelyn Bell Burnell spotted a signal with a period of 1.3 s (Bell Burnell 2003). Hewish received the 1974 Nobel Prize in Physics for the discovery, sharing the award with Martin Ryle, who was recognized for his wider contribution to radio astronomy. In his acceptance speech, Hewish mentioned the research he had carried out with Okoye as a significant step towards the discovery of pulsars.

Okoye was a fellow of the Nigerian Academy of Science as well as the Royal Astronomical Society of the United Kingdom. He was a member of the Pugwash Conferences on Science and World Affairs, the New York Academy of Sciences, International Network of Engineers and Scientists for Global Responsibility and the International Astronomical Union.

Career 
Okoye started teaching Physics at the University of Ibadan in 1965 and later transferred to the University of Nigeria, Nsukka (UNN) just before the outbreak of the Nigerian civil war, where he founded the University’s Space Research Center in 1972. There, he was elevated to a professorship in physics in 1976. Between 1978 and 1989, Professor Okoye was appointed the Director, Division of General Studies, Head Department of Physics and Astronomy; Associate Dean and later Dean of the Faculty of Physical Sciences. He was acting Vice Chancellor of the University of Nigeria from June to September 1978. Okoye was elected Dean School of Post Graduate Studies. University of Nigeria, Nsukka from 1987 to 1989.

On the international stage, Okoye attended several Pugwash Conferences on Science and World Affairs between 1979–91, serving as a member of Pugwash Council from 1988–93. These meetings, started in 1957, promoted dialogue between nations to free the world from the dangers of nuclear and other weapons of mass destruction. In later years they sought also to develop and support the use of scientific, evidence-based policymaking. Okoye's contributions were in the area of science for development.
Sam was a part-time consultant to the United Nations on the development of Space Science end Technology in developing countries (1979–1986).

Okoye was a visiting scientist at the Max Planck Institute for Radio Astronomy in Bonn, Germany between August and October 1986. From 1990-93, Okoye was also appointed a visiting Professor/Senior Research Fellow at the Institute of Astronomy, and Fellow Commoner at Churchill College at the University of Cambridge. In December 1993, Sam was seconded from the University of Nigeria to the Federal Government as Director (overseas liaison), initially at the National Agency for Science and Engineering Infrastructure (NASENI) Lagos, and subsequently the Nigerian Ministry of Science & Technology Abuja, where he also served as the pioneer Science attaché and Head of the Science and Technology Unit at the Nigerian High Commission, London.

Sam published numerous scientific papers on Ionosphere Physics, Solar Physics and  the Theory of Extragalactic Radio Sources and Cosmology. He also published a monograph, Viable and Affordable Policy Objectives for a Nigerian Space Programme in the 1980s and co-edited two books: Basic Science Development in Nigeria: Problems and Prospects, and the World at the Cross-roads: Towards a Sustainable, Equitable and Liveable World.

Okoye served Nigeria in a number of capacities including: 
 Member of the Federal Government delegation to the World Administrative Radio Conference in Geneva, Switzerland 1979;
 Member of the Federal Government delegation to the United Nations Conference on Peaceful Uses of Space in Vienna, Austria 1981;
 Member of the Federal Government Panel charged to produce an integrated energy policy for Nigeria (1984);
 Chairman, Court of Governors Awka Campus of the Anambra State University of Science and Technology (ASUTECH), (1988–1989);
 Member, Governing Council Anambra State University of Science and Technology, Enugu (1988–1989).
 Pioneer Science attaché, Nigeria High Commission London, United Kingdom (1993-2000).
 Director, National Agency for Science and Engineering Infrastructure (NASENI) and Federal Ministry of Science and Technology (1993-2000).

Lectureship at University of Ibadan (1966-67)
Following the award of a doctorate degree (Ph.D) by the University of Cambridge, Okoye returned to Nigeria and was immediately appointed Lecturer II in the Department of Physics of the University of Ibadan on 22 October 1966. This was the year of the Nigerian Crisis (1966-1970), but being of Eastern Nigerian origin, it was not deemed safe for him to continue working anywhere outside eastern Nigeria that subsequently proclaimed itself Biafra on 29 May 1967. He was among the refugee train of lecturers that left University of Ibadan with Professor Kenneth O. Dike and migrated into the University of Nigeria at Nsukka.

Commonwealth Academic Staff Fellow
Okoye made plans to establish a radio astronomy observatory in Nigeria. But by 1971 it became clear that no funding would be forthcoming for such an enterprise; as a result Okoye started to develop his interests in theoretical astrophysics. His boss, Professor James O. C. Ezeilo, the vice-chancellor of the University of Nigeria, Nsukka (UNN), approved; in the words of cash-strapped administrators everywhere, he wrote that this was a subject that could “be pursued in this university at little or no cost to the university” (Churchill College Archives). Okoye knew that he needed to travel to get up to speed; he looked for posts in the United States, but also applied for a Commonwealth Academic Staff Fellowship “to acquire some advanced mathematical techniques and seek out relevant theoretical solutions to current problems in astrophysics”. Okoye contacted his former colleagues at Cambridge. Both Hewish and Ryle recommended him strongly for the position. “Okoye is clearly a competent man, with drive and initiative, who can tackle both experimental and theoretical aspects of a project,” wrote Hewish in 1971.

Okoye returned to Cambridge in 1971–72 as a Commonwealth Academic Staff Fellow at the University of Cambridge, visiting fellow at the Institute of Astronomy, Cambridge and a fellow commoner of Churchill College. He worked at the IoA, supervised by Fred Hoyle, catching up on plasma physics, general relativity and cosmology and establishing his own high-energy astrophysics research, publishing on X-ray data from radio galaxies and the jet of M87. He also secured donations of laboratory teaching equipment from the Department of Physics at Cambridge for the University of Nigeria, Nsukka and school equipment from an educational charity for a school in the eastern region, to help recover from the civil war. He enjoyed his time at Churchill College and particularly appreciated the kindness of the college in paying for his wife and young children to come to Cambridge with him.

Sam admiring a telescope at a colloquium at Williams College in Williamstown, Massachusetts. USA (1988)

Institutional Building as Head Department of Physics (1978-1981) & Dean Faculty of Physical Sciences (1983-85)
On return from the civil war he was appointed a reader and worked under the leadership of Prof Cyril Onwumechili (the Head of Physics Department) and was promoted on 1 October 1976 to the rank of Professor of Physics. During this period, the Department undertook a total overhaul and revamping of the physics degree curricular, which were then below international standards. For the first time in the history of the department, a curriculum was proposed and designed for post-graduate teaching and research in the four main physics sub-disciplines of Astrophysics, Geophysics, Materials Science/Solid State Physics and Nuclear/High Energy Particle Physics, under the respective leaderships of Professor Cyril Onwumechili, Professor Sam Okoye, Professor Frank Ndili, Dr Satya Pal and later from September 1976 Professor Alex Animalu. When Okoye became Head of Department from 1978–81, he took a further step of expanding the physics degree curriculum at the undergraduate level to include astronomy as a mandatory course in the third year as well as fourth year degree optional topics in astrophysics. It was therefore natural for a case to be successfully made to Senate, the Governing Council, and the National Universities Commission for the departmental name to be upgraded to “Department of Physics and Astronomy”, thus becoming one of a handful of elite academic departments in the world so named, and certainly the first one in Africa. In furtherance of his efforts to develop teaching and research facilities for the sub-discipline of Astrophysics in the department, he arranged in 1979 for a high quality 10 metre parabolic aluminium dish radio antenna worth US$50,000, at 1973 prices to be donated by the Astronomy Department of the University of California, Berkeley to the UNN. This was later followed up by a personal donation of N100, 000 by Dr Nnamdi Azikiwe, the founder and first Chancellor of UNN, for astronomical research. Augmented by a further Senate grant of N50,000, buildings and a radio telescope forming the initial and other electronic equipment's constituted the initial facilities of the university’s Space Research Centre which, on commissioning by Dr Nnamdi Azikiwe during the University’s silver jubilee celebrations in 1985, became known as the Nnamdi Azikiwe Space Research Centre--- again the first in black Africa.

Postgraduate teaching and research
An important function of any senior academic is the training of the next generation of academics who would carry the torch of higher learning after his departure from the scene. In Okoye’s case, starting from scratch without any programme, facilities, academic colleagues support staff, it was a matter for personal satisfaction that by the time he retired from the department, Astrophysics had become not only a viable discipline at the University of Nigeria, but single-handedly, and in some cases with the help of colleagues have graduated a total of 18 post graduates of which 9 were Master's and 9 PhDs. In terms of the above PhDs, it was not enough to see to their graduation, but he made special efforts to introduce them to the international astronomy community through short visits to other departments and institutes and also through encouragement to attend international conferences. Of these, four (Akujor, Ubachukwu, Anyakoha and Anene) are currently professors. This lot, in terms of numbers, was enough to staff a moderately sized physics department such as we had in Nigeria.
In addition to his postgraduate development in UNN, Okoye trained a number of research staff and technologists to assist in the development of Space Research Centre. Notable among these was Prof. Pius N. Okeke whose Ph.D. (the first produced at UNN) was supervised by Prof F.N. Ndili but whom Prof Okoye further trained by sending him not only to the University of Cambridge where he was supervised by Sir Professor M.J. Rees, a high energy astronomer and one of the most distinguished Cosmic Ray physicists in the world but also to India. Other beneficiaries of Sam Okoye’s training include Mr N.C. Adibe, late Mr. J.C. Igbo, Dr Felix Anyaegbunam and Dr. (Mrs.) Lesley Onuora.

Space Research Centre at UNN
 

The history of Space Research activities in the University of Nigeria dates back to 1962 when Professor John Gaustard introduced the Department of Mathematics at the university. At that time, Astronomy was only taught at undergraduate level. Professor Gaustard’s initial effort to develop this Basic Space Science, Astronomy and Astrophysics, was thwarted in 1967 by the Nigeria Civil War. At the end of the three year Civil War, fresh moves were initiated to put UNN in particular and Nigeria in general on the Space Research Map. This time, the development of Space Science shifted from the department of Mathematics to Physics department. 
 
Although Okoye conceived the idea of establishing a Space Research Centre at the University of Nigeria, Nsukka (UNN) as early as 1972, the conception remained at best a dream for the next five years. Even his determined efforts to embark on early space science research activities on the theoretical front were frustrated by lack of relevant manpower and funds. The origin of what is known today as the Space Research Centre, UNN (SRC-UNN) can be traced to 1977 during the launching of the university’s endowment fund. During the December, 1977 launching, the founding father of the university and the first president of Nigeria late Dr Nnamdi Azikiwe made a handsome donation of a N100,000 (one hundred thousand naira) to the endowment fund. To demonstrate his unequalled love for space science research. This endowment from the founding father of the university was very timely since the university had shortly before then received a donation of 10m, parabolic dish from the University of California, Berkeley United States of America. A gift which the university was until then at a loss as to what to do with, hence with these two donations, N100,000 and 10m dish, to the University of Nigeria, Nsukka, the Space Research Centre conceived five years earlier was ‘born’. This initial facility of the Centre was a single antenna radio telescope operating at 327 MHz. There was a proposal to upgrade the radio telescope to full VLBI station capable of operating at 327 MHz, 6000 MHz and possibly 1.4 GHz. There was also plan for second 10 -14 metre parabolic antenna for space applications experiments in high speed digital date transmission via satellites for meteorological and geodetic applications as well as for propagation experiments relevant to satellite communication.

The Vice-Chancellor, Frank Ndili responded promptly to the donations by setting up a twelve-man interfaculty planning committee. This comprised some members of staff from Physical Sciences and Engineering and Administrative representatives for the proposed Space Research Centre.

Okoye-led planning committee which was reporting directly to the joint council/senate committee on endowment fund had, as its terms of reference to prepare ground for the immediate take off of the Centre and to define its long term objectives. 
The long-term objectives of the SRC as worked out by the planning Committee were as follow:
i. To pursue a programme of scientific research with a view to consolidating existing knowledge or uncovering fundamental knowledge concerning our cosmic environment by making use of either ground base or spaceborne observational equipment.
ii. To undertake development and production of space technology systems such as artificial satellites and rockets as well as their control systems.
iii. To set up scientific programmes, which make it possible for the specific needs of the country as required space science.
iv. To undertake the training of space scientists, engineers and technologists for the needs of the nation.
v. To devise scientific programmes that provide a means of developing a feeling of confidence and self-reliance among the participating Nigeria scientists and engineers.
vi. To provide a means for greater international understanding, solidarity, corporation and collaboration between scientists and engineers of the third world in the first instance and the world generally.

By December the same year, the committee had completed its assignment and made a number of recommendations to the University. Among other things, the planning Committee recommended that the Space Centre be named Nnamdi Azikiwe Space Research Centre and that efforts should be intensified to produce the 10m dish and its mounting donated to the University by University of California. As a result of the high level of understanding, which existed among the various committees, and the Vice-Chancellor of the university, additional funds were also secured for the proposed centre. These included a special National University Commission (NUC) grant of N39,000 for the acquisition of the 33-foot dish, a Senate Research grant to Professor Okoye and his group for the construction of the control building of the Space Research Centre and Chief J.I. Mbaezue, chairman, JIMBAZ (WA) Limited also made special grant of N4,788 towards the construction of the control building. Having received these donations, the preparatory activities for the commencement of the Space Research Centre ensued. Firstly, a project vehicle was procured for the Centre.

Construction work also started on the building. Moves were also initiated to procure the 33-foot dish gift from University of California, Berkeley. This led to overseas training of a number of technical and academic staff of the then department of Physics. First on the list was late Mr. J.C. Igbo who travelled to Berkeley in August, 1979 to participate in the disassembling and crating of the dish. Later in 1979, P.N. Okeke received a research fellowship to Cambridge where he spent six months with the Institute of Astronomy Cambridge University, UK. He also travelled to Ootacamund in India in February, 1980 where he received training in the observational Radio Astronomy. Later, in February 1981, Mr. N.C. Adibe was sent to India for the integration, testing and checkout of the electronic system of the dish before airfreighting.
Within the same period, the Centre was able to engage the services of two specialists in Space Science. They included Professor M.N. Joshi, (Mayor) an electronic specialist, who is to assist in the installation and training of local personnel; and Mr Raffanti, a telescope engineer from Berkeley, who was to supervise the construction of the telescope mount. In the meantime a link had been established with the Radio Astronomy Centre, Ooty of the Tata Institute of Fundamental Research, Bombay, India and it was agreed that a multi-channel receiver and digital acquisition system to act as the back end of the telescope were to be designed and built in India with the participation of one of our technologists. The philosophy was that a 10m dish by itself was virtually a non-starter for doing front-line research in radio Astronomy. However such dish when used with a much larger dish for simultaneous correlation observation (e.g. of pulsars quasars etc) could achieve an effective sensitivity equal to the geometric mean of the apertures of the two antennas not possible with the 10m dishes used on its own. Hence the idea of collaborative work with India was born with prospect for similar collaborative projects with big telescopes in Bonn, Jaddreall Bank, and Westerbok as part of a very long base index (VLBI) interferometer system. After careful consideration and consultations with our Indian collaborator it was decided to build the following items of electronic equipment:
1. One complete 327 MHz receiver system with rack and 12 narrow pass band channels of 300 KHz and one channel of about 3.8 MHz all with analogue output.
2. One digital unit consisting of 16-channel multiplexer 10/12 bit ADC, quarter digital clock and incremental magnetic tape recorder.

An application was made to the University Senate for a research grant for funds to acquire a Very-long-baseline interferometry (VLBI) network as well as carry out independent VLBI studies with the Indian group and others that might be interested. As part of preparation to take off, in 1988 a linkage agreement was signed between SRC and Max Planck Institute (MPI) Germany to set up a VLBI terminal, which placed the radio antenna in SRC in a position to participate in the worldwide VLBI programme.

Academic appointments
 1961-62: Part-time demonstrator in Physics University College, Ibadan
 1962-65: Part-time Demonstrator in Physics, Cavendish Laboratory, University of Cambridge.
 1965-66: Lecturer II Department of Physics, University of Ibadan.
 1966-70: Lecturer Department of Physics, University of Nigeria (UNN)
 1970-74: Senior Lecturer, Department of Physics, University of Nigeria (UNN).
 1971-72: Commonwealth Academic Staff Fellow. Also, Visiting Fellow, Institute of Astronomy, University of Cambridge and concurrently Fellow Commoner, Churchill College, Cambridge.
 1973 (September): Guest Scientist. Sterrawacht, University of Leiden. The Netherlands.
 1974-76: Reader (Associate Professor), Department of Physics, University of Nigeria (UNN).
 1975 (July-Oct) Visiting scientist, National Radio Astronomy Observatory, Charlottesville, Virginia, United States.
 1974-76: Coordinator, Natural Science Program, Division of General Studiers, University of Nigeria (UNN).
 1978 (July–August) Director, IAU-UNESCO, International School for Young Astronomers held in UNN for West African participants.
 1976 (July –August): Guest Scientist, Institute of Astronomy, University of Cambridge.
 1979 (July-Sept) Visiting Scientist, National Radio Astronomy Observatory, Charlottesville, Virginia, United States.
 1976-2002: Professor, Department of Physics and Astronomy, University of Nigeria (UNN).
 1976-78: Director, Division of General Studies, University of Nigeria (UNN).
 1978 (July–August) Acting Vice-Chancellor, University of Nigeria (UNN).
 1978-81: Head Department of Physics and concurrently, Coordinator, Space Research Centre Project, University of Nigeria (UNN).
 1980 (July-Sept) Guest Scientist, Sterrawacht, University of Leiden, The Netherlands.
 1981-85: Chairman, Implementation Committee of the Space Research Centre Project.
 1982-83: Associate Dean, Faculty of Physical Sciences, University of Nigeria (UNN).
 1983-1985: Dean, Faculty of Physical Sciences, University of Nigeria (UNN).
 1985-89: Director, Nnamdi Azikiwe Space Research Centre, University of Nigeria (UNN).
 1986 (August–October) : Visiting Scientist, Max Planck Institute for Radio Astronomy, Bonn, Germany. 
 1987-89: Dean, School of Post-Graduate Studies, University of Nigeria (UNN).
 1990-93: Visiting Professor, Institute of Astronomy, University of Cambridge and concurrently, Fellow Commoner, Churchill College, Cambridge .

Public appointments
 1970-76 Member, Nsukka Local Government Social Welfare Council.
 1971-77 Member, Njikoka Divisional School Board.
 1975-77 Member. East Central State Coordinating Committee of the National Youth Service Corps (NYSC).
 1979 (October–December) Consultant to the Nigerian Delegation to the 1979 World Administrative Radio Conference (WARC) held in Geneva, Switzerland.
 1982 (August–September). Member, Nigerian Delegation to the 1982 United Nations Conference on peaceful uses of Outer Space (UNISPACE 82) held in Vienna, Austria.
 1984 Chairman, Panel on the revamping of science teaching in the Imo State School system.
 1984 Member, National Energy Review Panel responsible for the formulation of a comprehensive and integrated national energy policy for Nigeria.
 1985 Member, Anambra Review Panel on the merger of the Institute of Management and Technology (IMT) and the Anambra State University of Science and Technology (ASUTECH).
 1985 Member, Anambra State Development Advisory Council.
 1986 Member, Anambra State Education and Technology (ASET) Fund Mobilizing Committee.
 1986-87 Member, Interim Joint Governing Council of Institute of Management and Technology (IMT) and Anambra State University of Science and Technology (ASUTECH).
 1988-90 Member, Governing Council Anambra State University of Science and Technology (ASUTECH).
 1988-90 Chairman, Court of Governors, Awka Campus of the Anambra State University of Science and Technology (ASUTECH).
 1988-93 Member, Governing Council of Pugwash Conferences on Science and World Affairs.

Science Attaché

On 18 August 1993 (with effect from 14th September 1993), Okoye was appointed Nigeria's pioneer Science Attaché to the Kingdom to cover all the countries of the European Economic Community. He was seconded (while in London) to the National Agency for Science and Engineering Infrastructure (NASENI) under late Professor Gordian Ezekwe, and subsequently transferred to the office of the Hon. Minister of Science and Technology with effect from 1 January 1994. Until Sam's appointment as Science Attaché in the Nigerian High Commission London, the Ministry of Foreign Affairs had no science and technology department in any of its diplomatic missions abroad. His functions included tracking developments both in science policy and its implementations in the countries of the European Union and the rest of the developed world. In this regard, particular attention was paid to national wealth creation technologies as they pertained to agriculture, industry and national security. Other areas of activity involved developments in health care delivery, biotechnology and communications and information technology. Highlights of his achievements include a number of seminal briefing reports on the following subjects:
1. The World Wide Web (WWW) and the Internet. It was also recommended that a National Agency for the development of Information Technology, which among other functions will establish a number of national internet gateway for Nigeria as well as a national internet network to which all Federal establishments will be connected. It was also recommended that the National Universities Commission should establish a central server to which all universities should be connected, thus providing Nigerian Universities access to the stupendous resources of the Internet.
2. Recent developments in biotechnology, particularly in agriculture and medicine. A strong suggestion was made about the supreme importance of establishing a National Commission for the development of Biotechnology. This has now been done.
3. Vision 2010 Document. Okoye made a substantial input to the submission of the Federal Ministry of Science and Technology (FMST) to the Vision 2010 document.
4. Okoye submitted a highly classified document to the FMST as well as the national Defence and Security organizations on what the developing countries should know about biological weapons of mass destruction. It was pointed out that the bottom line why the developing countries are held to ransom by the militarily strong advanced countries depended on the latter’s possession of nuclear weapons and other weapons of mass destruction. It was suggested that the developing countries could redress the balance in the possession of weapons of mass destruction by the acquisition of biological weapons of mass destruction which are not only cheap and easy to conceal but the expertise to produce them is within the ken of microbiologists in developing countries.

Personal life
Sam married Chinyere Ucheime Obioha in April, 1969. Chinyere (1942-2007) was a native of Arondizuogu in Imo State, South East (Nigeria). Chi was a Deputy Librarian at the University of Nigeria, Nsukka and was later appointed Assistant Director of Library Services at the National Judicial Council, Abuja.

They were blessed with four children. Maureen (Lawyer), Obinna (IT Consultant), Ndidi (Physician) and Amaechi (Political Scientist).

Sam enjoyed photography, playing tennis and was well travelled. He visited over 50 countries in 7 continents. Sam collected and listened to a variety of music genres.

Okoye died in London on 18 November 2009.

Legacy

When Okoye started his career, politicians and officials in his native Nigeria believed that astronomy was an esoteric topic of little practical use. His sustained efforts to bring astronomy to Nigeria throughout his career were repeatedly frustrated by lack of funding and practical support. Yet he maintained his interest in high-energy astrophysics, keeping in touch with Hewish and other supporters at the University of Cambridge and developing new research contacts in the USA and Europe, as well as across Africa. His efforts resulted in the UNN teaching astronomy and space as part of its undergraduate physics course; master's and doctoral students followed. Nigeria developed a small space programme, launching its first satellite in 1996. The country has not yet established a significant radio telescope, although this remains an objective. The Space Research Centre at UNN was the forerunner of today's Centre for Basic Space Research (CBSS) which opened in 2001, part of the National Space and Development Agency set up by the Nigerian government in 1999. The CBSS has research links with Nigerian universities and research institutes in Japan, South Africa, USA and Europe. The centre promotes research, teaching and outreach, including in climate and solar research and instrumentation as well as astronomy and – it is hoped – radio astronomy.

Sam Okoye may have been the first Nigerian radio astronomer, but he was certainly not the last. His vision for astronomy as an end in itself and as a tool for development – in Nigeria and elsewhere – is finally being realized. Radio astronomy is taking root across the continent, not least in South Africa, home to the Square Kilometre Array mid-frequency array. The UK-led Development in Africa through Radio Astronomy (DARA; dara-project.org) is aiming to produce a technologically savvy workforce through radio astronomy. And now Nsukka is the home of the West African regional centre of the OAD, setting the seal on this remarkable turnaround in attitudes to astronomy.

Recognition
1952 - Won the Eastern Nigerian Outlook Newspaper competition for primary school pupils of the old Eastern Nigeria. 
1952 - Won full tuition and boarding entrance scholarship to the Government Secondary School, Owerri. 
1959 - Won full tuition and boarding College scholarship of the University College, Ibadan, for excellent performance at end of first year examinations performance. This earned him the title of “College Scholar”. 
1959 - Awarded the Eastern Nigerian Scholarship for B.Sc (physics) tenable at the University College, Ibadan. 
1962 - Won the Departmental Prize for the best graduating student in the Department of Physics of the University of Ibadan. 
1962 - Awarded on a worldwide competitive basis the Carnegie Foundation fellowship for doctoral studies tenable at the University of Cambridge, United Kingdom.
1982 - Inducted as a fellow of the Nigerian Academy of Science

Publications

Books
International Institute for Space Sciences and T. Odhiambo, & Electronics and the Giant Equatorial Radio Telescope, Tata Press Ltd., Bombay, India.  G. Swarup,  S. E. Okoye 100 pp. (1979).
Viable and Affordable Policy Objectives for a Nigerian Space Programme in the 1980s and beyond, An occasional publication of the Department of Physics, University of Nigeria, 108 pp.,  (1981). S.  E.  Okoye
Basic Science Development in Nigeria:  Problems and Prospects.  Evans Brothers (Nigeria) Publishers Ltd., 325 pp.  (1987).  S. E. Okoye  &  K. M. Onuoha(eds).
The World at the crossroads : towards a sustainable, equitable and liveable world : a report to the Pugwash Council  edited by Philip B. Smith, Samuel E. Okoye, Jaap de Wilde and Priya Deshingkar. London : Earthscan, 1994.

Articles
 “The problem of technological development in developing countries” in “The Proceedings of the 5th international conference  on ‘Science and  :Society: Scientific, Technological and Social Development., Goals and Values” Belgrade,.  pp205–216  (1974) S. E. Okoye
 ”Perspectives on the Technology Creation and TransferProblem in developing Countries” in “Proceedings of the 6th International Conference on Science and Society-- Cooperation and interdependence in the Modern World”. Belgrade., pp 287–295. (1977).  S. E. Okoye
 “Traditional African Languages as a medium for Scientific Creativity and Innovation” in “Readings on African Humanities : African Cultural Development” O.U.Kalu (ed)  Fourth Dimension Publishers pp  260–274  (1978).  S.E.Okoye.
 “The Mastery of Space: A matter of Intellectual Identity” in  “Alternate Space Future and the Human Condition”— A United Nations Publication. L.Karnik., Pergamon Press New York, pp 78–80 and 118-120. (1982).  S.E.Okoye
 The detection of fine structure in the Crab Nebula at 38 Mc/s, Nature, 203 171, (1964).  A. Hewish. & S.E. Okoye
 Evidence of an unusual source of high brightness temperature in  the Crab Nebula, Nature 207, 59-60. (1965) A. Hewish. & S.E. Okoye
 Irregularities oh plasma density in the solar neighborhood, Mon. Not. R. Astron. Soc.137 287-296. (1968) S.E. Okoye & A. Hewish.
 The occurrence of large ionospheric irregularities J. atm, terr, Phys.,  30, 163-167. (1968). S.E. Okoye & A. Hewish.
 The interpretation of  the X-ray emission detected from nearby Radio Galaxies, Mon, Not, R.Astr, Soc., 160, 339-348. (1972) S.E. Okoye
 Inverse Compton X-ray generation in QSS and the distance problem. Mon, Not, R. Astr Soc. 165 413-419. (1973). S.E. Okoye
 The stability of M87 Jet, Mon Not R. Astr Soc, 165, 393-402. (1973).  S.E. Okoye
 Compact Radio Source Spectra, West Afr. J Sci, 19. No2,  159-169. (1974) S.E. Okoye.
 Inverse Compton X-ray generation in leaky Radio Galaxies. West, Afri, J. Sci. 20. No1, (1975) S.E. Okoye.
 A model for cm-excess radio sources, Astrophys J. 209,  362-393. (1976). S.E. Okoye
 The redshift controversy of quasars, Bull. Nig. Inst. 2,  No2, 80-99  (1977). S.E. Okoye
 An exploratory documents on the scientific objectives Radio Astronomy . document 300-E  IUCAF, WARC Geneva, pp14. (1979). S.E. Okoye
 Angular-diameter-red shift relations for Extragalactic Radio Sources,  Astrophys J, 260. 37-43. (1982) S.E. Okoye & L.I.Onuora.
 Proton-proton-collisions in extragalactic radio sources, In: Extragalactic radio sources Ed.  D.S.Heeschen & C.M.Wade. D. Reidel. Publ. Co. Boston. USA. (1982)  S.E. Okoye & P.N.Okeke
 Optical inverse Compton emission in extragalactic O.Obinabo.   radio sources, In Extragalactic radio sources, Ed.  D.S.Heeschen and C.M.Wade., D. Reidel. Publ Co. Boston, USA. (1982) S.E. Okoye & O.Obinabo
 The variation of radio luminosity with epoch and its effect on the angular-diameter relations.  S.E..Okoye    Astrophys J. 270. 360-364. (1983) L.I.Onuora S.E. Okoye.
 The radiation energy density in compact radio sources. West Afri J. Sci  vol 25  (1980)  S.E.Okoye
 The Hunger Alert.  Bull. Atomic Scientists.  38.  No. 1  28-29  (1982).  S.E.Okoye
 Cosmic Dimensions of violence, Discourses, Nig Acad, Sci.  6,  45-55, (1984) S.E.Okoye
 An investigation of a two-station pulsar inter-Stellar scintillations radio observation program Between Nsukka and Ooctamund, India. Proc. Nig. Acad, Sci.  1  16-23.  (1986).  S.E.Okoye & P.N.Okeke
 A test for models of radio source evolution.  Astrophys& Spa Sci.  122  267-279. !1986). S.E.Okoye & L.I.Onuora
 Estimates of proton energies in EGRS. Astrophys. Spa Sci. 132.  65-72.  (1987).  M.W.Anyakoha, P.N.Okeke & S.E.Okoye
 Radio Emission from large-scale radio jets.  Astrophys J.  328   220-229.  (1988). M.W.Anyakoha, P.N.Okeke & S.E.Okoye
 Space Research: A tool for National Development and Security.  Discourses Nig. Acad. Sci. 71-82.  (1988). S.E.Okoye
 A model of gamma ray emission from large-scale Jets.  In Proceedings of the  American Physics Workshop of Nuclear Spectroscopy of Astrophysical sources., Ed. W Gehoels and G.H.Share.  pp 350–355.  (1988). M.W.Anyakoha, P.N.Okeke & S.E.Okoye
 Prediction of high-energy gamma rays from Extragalactic Jets.  Astro Lett & Comm.  373-380.  (1990). M.W.Anyakoha, P.N.Okeke & S.E.Okoye
 The confinement and Cosmological evolution of Extragalactic Radio Source Components.  Ap.J 383.  56-59.  (1991). A.A.Ubachukwu  S.E.Okoye & L.I.Onuora
 Origin of the radio gap in extragalactic radio sources. Astrophys & Spa. Sci. 187.  209-214.  (1992).   I.E.Ekejiuba, P.N.Okeke & S.E.Okoye
 The nature of ejected protons from the nuclei of extragalactic radio sources. Astrophys. & Spa. Sci.  167  215-218.  (1992).  I.E.Ekejiuba, P.N.Okeke & S.E.Okoye
 3On the origin of magnetic fields associated with radio haloes in galaxy clusters.  Mon. Not. R. Astron Soc.  283  1047-1054. (1996). S.E.Okoye & L.I.Onuora
 The problem of the interpretation of extra-galactic radio source spectra. (IC/73/104) International Centre for Theoretical Physics.  Trieste, Italy. Internal Report. 10pp (1073).  S.E.Okoye
 A Review of the development of Water Resources of small Pacific Islands.  Commissioned Report by the Commonwealth Science Council. London. pp  24  (1989) S.E.Okoye
 Science Information and Dissemination:  Regional mobile Science and Technology Exhibitions for developing countries of the Commonwealth.  Commissioned Report by the Commonwealth Science Council, London.  15 pp (1991). S.E.Okoye
 Funding Sources for Commonwealth Science Council Programmes and Projects.  Commissioned Report by the Commonwealth Science Council, London. 27 pp (1996)  S.E.Okoye
 National Policy for Science and Technology for the year 2000 AD and beyond : Realizing the National Potential. Report to the Federal Ministry of Science and Technology, Abuja, 33 pp. (1996)  S.E.Okoye

References
Citations

8. Biography of The Foremost Nigerian Radio Astronomer, Prof Sam E. Okoye FAS, FRAS, FNIP (Authors: Alexander O.E. Animalu and Pius N. Okeke) - Published by Centre for Basic Space Science 2009.

9. Nigeria's first radio astronomer: Astronomy & Geophysics, Volume 61, Issue 5, 1 October 2020, Pages 5.28–5.30

External links 
 Sam Okoye, Africa's foremost astrophysicist dies
 World Administrative Radio Conference 1979 - List of Participants (page 60)
 Top Nigerian scientist, The Guardian columnist, Prof. Sam Okoye
 A parable of four men
 Nigeria's first radio astronomer: Astronomy & Geophysics, Volume 61, Issue 5, 1 October 2020, Pages 5.28–5.30 
 https://www.schoolsobservatory.org/careers/interested/stargazing/samuel-okoye
 University of Nigeria, Nsukka

Nigerian astrophysicists
Academic staff of the University of Ibadan
Academic staff of the University of Nigeria
1939 births
2009 deaths
Alumni of Churchill College, Cambridge
Nigerian scientists
Nigerian writers